William Lindsay Ross (2 May 1921 – 14 November 1995) was a Scottish footballer who played in the Scottish League for Queen's Park as a centre half. After his retirement, he served the club in a number of administrative roles. Ross was capped by Scotland at amateur level.

Personal life 
Ross served in the Royal Air Force during the Second World War and later worked as a solicitor.

References 

Scottish footballers
Scottish Football League players
Queen's Park F.C. players
Association football wing halves
Scotland amateur international footballers
Scottish solicitors
Queen's Park F.C. non-playing staff
1921 births
1995 deaths
Footballers from Hamilton, South Lanarkshire
Royal Air Force personnel of World War II
Glasgow University F.C. players